Gerald Presley (born 1942 in Arnprior, Ontario) was a Canadian bobsledder who competed in the mid-1960s. He won a gold medal in the four-man event at the 1965 FIBT World Championships in St. Moritz.

Presley was inducted into Canada's Sports Fall of Fame in 1965 and into the Canadian Forces Sports Hall of Fame in 2001.

References
Bobsleigh four-man world championship medalists since 1930
Canada's Sports Hall of Fame profile

Canadian male bobsledders
Living people
Sportspeople from Ontario
1942 births
People from Arnprior, Ontario